Polinices lacteus is a species of predatory sea snail, a marine gastropod mollusk in the family Naticidae, the moon snails.

Distribution
Polinices lacteus specimens have been found throughout the southern Atlantic coastlines. This includes the Caribbean Sea, as well as the Canary Islands, the Angolan coast, and the Cape Verde island chain. The species has also been spotted on almost the entirety of the South American coast, plus the Gulf of Mexico.

Description 
The maximum recorded shell length is 40 mm.Operculum is thin, horny, yellow or amber-red. (R.Tucker Abbott -1968- "Seashells of North America")  Periostracum is thin, yellowish.

Habitat 
The minimum recorded depth for this species is 0 m; maximum recorded depth is 120 m.

References

 Brooks S.T. 1933. Natica sancti-vincentii, sp. nov. Annals of the Carnegie Museum, 21: 413
 MEDIN. (2011). UK checklist of marine species derived from the applications Marine Recorder and UNICORN. version 1.0.
 Rolán E., 2005. Malacological Fauna From The Cape Verde Archipelago. Part 1, Polyplacophora and Gastropoda.
 Bernard, P.A. (Ed.) (1984). Coquillages du Gabon [Shells of Gabon]. Pierre A. Bernard: Libreville, Gabon. 140, 75 plates pp

External links
 Philippi, R. A. (1849-1853). Die Gattungen Natica und Amaura. In Abbildungen nach der Natur mit Beschreibungen. In: Küster, H. C., Ed. Systematisches Conchylien-Cabinet von Martini und Chemnitz. Neu herausgegeben und vervollständigt. Zweiten Bandes erste Abtheilung. 2(1): 2 (1): 1-66, 65[a, 66[a], 67-164, pls. A, 1-19. Nürnberg: Bauer & Raspe (publication dates: 1-18 [1849]; 19-26 [1850]; 67-120 [1851]; 27-66 [1852]; 121-164 ]
 Orbigny, A. D. d'. (1839-1842). Mollusques, Echinodermes, Foraminifères et Polypiers recueillis aux Iles Canaries par MM. Webb et Berthelot et décrits par Alcide d'Orbigny. Mollusques. 117 p., pl. 1-7, 7B (p. 1-24 [Aug. 1839, 25-48 [Sept. 1839], 49-72 [Oct-1839], 73-104 [Jan. 1840], 105-136 [Mar. 1840],137-143 [Apr. 1840], 145-152 [Aug. 1842] pl. 1 [Jul. 1836], 2 [Dec. 1836], 3 [May 1842], 4-5 [June 1840], 7 [May 1842], 6,7B [Aug. 1842]. Béthune, Paris ]
 Rosenberg, G.; Moretzsohn, F.; García, E. F. (2009). Gastropoda (Mollusca) of the Gulf of Mexico, Pp. 579–699 in: Felder, D.L. and D.K. Camp (eds.), Gulf of Mexico–Origins, Waters, and Biota. Texas A&M Press, College Station, Texas

Naticidae
Gastropods described in 1834
Molluscs of the Atlantic Ocean
Molluscs of Angola
Molluscs of Brazil
Molluscs of the Canary Islands
Gastropods of Cape Verde